The 2017–18 VMI Keydets basketball team represented the Virginia Military Institute in the 2017–18 NCAA Division I men's basketball season. The Keydets were led by third-year head coach Dan Earl and played their home games out of Cameron Hall in Lexington, Virginia, their home since 1981, as members of the Southern Conference. They finished the season 9–21, 4–14 in SoCon play to finish in ninth place. They lost in the first round of the SoCon tournament to The Citadel.

Previous season 
The Keydets finished the 2016–17 season with an overall record of 6–24, and a 3–15 mark in SoCon play to finish in last place. They lost in the first round of the SoCon tournament to Samford. They lost their three leading scorers and rebounders in QJ Peterson, Julian Eleby, and Trey Chapman.

Preseason

Departures
VMI experienced noticeable roster turnover from the previous year, losing their three starting seniors as well as several other players to transfer. This included the Keydets' leading scorer and rebounder, QJ Peterson, who averaged nearly 20 points per game. Overall, VMI lost 71% of their point production, over half of their rebounding, and 63% of their assists to either graduation or transfer.

Coaching changes
The offseason saw the departure of two VMI assistant coaches. On April 7, 2017, Rice head coach Scott Pera announced the hiring of Chris Kreider as an assistant coach. Kreider had been with the Keydets for the previous two seasons under head coach Dan Earl. Five days later, on April 12, 2017, it was announced that Jason Slay, who had also been in his second year with the program, was given an assistant coaching position at Youngstown State.

In May, Earl announced the hiring of VMI basketball standout Austin Kenon as an assistant. Kenon played for VMI and ranks first in program history with 349 made three-pointers. Also that month, Earl added Kevin Carroll to the coaching staff, who had previously been the head coach at Division II Maryville University for seven seasons.

Roster

Ref:

Depth chart

Schedule and results

|-
!colspan=9 style=| Non-conference regular season

|-
!colspan=9 style=| Southern Conference regular season

|-
!colspan=9 style=| Southern Conference tournament

References 

VMI Keydets basketball seasons
VMI
VMI Keydets bask
VMI Keydets bask